Kalateh-ye Khvosh may refer to:
 Kalateh-ye Khvosh, North Khorasan
 Kalateh-ye Khvosh, Razavi Khorasan